Army & Navy Stores was a department store group in the United Kingdom, which originated as a co-operative society for military officers and their families during the nineteenth century. The society became a limited liability company in the 1930s and purchased multiple independent department stores during the 1950s and 1960s. In 1973, the Army and Navy Stores group was acquired by House of Fraser. In 2005, the remaining Army & Navy stores (the flagship store located on Victoria Street in London and stores in Camberley, and Chichester) were refurbished and re-branded under the House of Fraser nameplate. House of Fraser itself was acquired by Icelandic investment company, Baugur Group, in late 2006, and then by Sports Direct on the 10 August 2018.

The Victoria Street department store, trading as House of Fraser in 2019, is situated in the City of Westminster, to the south of St. James's Park. It is the only department store to trade in the locality.
Each of its four selling-floors holds a broad range of merchandise including clothing, accessories and cosmetics, furnishing, household and electrical goods. 'World of Food', a new food hall concept in House of Fraser stores (introduced at Birmingham in 2003), was opened on the Ground Floor to coincide with the store's relaunch under the 'House of Fraser' name but has since closed.

History

The Army & Navy Co-operative Society Ltd. was incorporated on 15 September 1871, being formed by a group of army and navy officers. The aim of the military co-operative was to supply goods to its members at the lowest remunerative rates, and was based on two earlier models – the Civil Service Supply Association and the Civil Service Co-operative Society. The society leased part of a distillery premises in Victoria Street, London which was owned by Vickers & Co, and by February 1872 a store for the sale of groceries was opened on the site. By 1873, the store offered stationery, drapery, fancy goods, tailoring, groceries, a chemist and even a guns department. The store proved too small for the growing business so the founding members  rented a house next to their existing warehouse and acquired a further warehouse in Johnson Place.

By 1876, the business had again outgrown its premises. They leased more of the distillery from Vickers, closed their warehouse in Johnson Place moving to a new location at Ranelagh Road in Pimlico. The business was now offering a banking department to its members, and had negotiated an option on the site as part of the lease deal at Victoria Street. This option was taken up in 1878, allowing for the purchase of part of the Victoria Street premises. A refreshments room was added to the store for its growing customer base. The store also expanded internationally by opening offices in Paris and Leipzig.

The business continued to expand, and in 1881 the society purchased the remaining distillery and associated buildings. In the following months departments were opened covering the entire site. In addition, warehousing was moved to Tooley Street in Westminster, with the Pimlico site now operating as a manufacturing centre for tailoring and printing. Printing had been carried out in-house since 1877. Further workshop space was purchased in Johnson Street, and offices in Howick Place were converted into selling space. By this time the business had added furniture sales and an estate agency to its operations.

The society continued to grow, so new locations were added. In 1890 stores were opened in Plymouth, and Bombay, India, while in 1891 a further store was opened in Karachi. This Indian adventure continued with stores opening in Calcutta in 1900, while stores in New Delhi, Shimla and Ranchi were opened in the 1930s.

The society still continued to expand in London, erecting a new preserved provisions factory in Coburg Road, and purchasing more property along Victoria Street. The society offered an enormous illustrated price list which could be ordered by phone.

The First World War saw trade suffer badly, but this was supplanted in part by a contract from the War Office. After the war, the society was hit by strikes by its staff, but it continued to develop its Victoria Street site and by 1922 a new frontage had been added.

The last surviving member of the original board, Captain Ernest Lewis, died on 3 April 1926. He was joint managing director and treasurer until he retired in July 1914 after 43 years with the society. One of his sons was Donald Swain Lewis, senior officer, who died in the Royal Flying Corps in 1916.

In 1934, the society was incorporated into a limited company – Army & Navy Stores Ltd. The Army and Navy Stores Limited 'General Price list 1935-36' listed showrooms and offices at 105 Victoria Street, Francis Street and Howick Place, Westminster SW1. Depots were listed in Union Street, Plymouth, Devon and in India at Esplanade Road, Bombay and Chowringhee, Calcutta. There was also a furniture depository and strong room at Turnham Green and an auction room at Greencoat Place SW1.

The business was hit hard during the Second World War with both its sites at Turnham Green and Portsmouth suffering serious bomb damage, while its Plymouth depot was completely destroyed. Trading difficulties were further accentuated after the war when India gained independence in 1947. The last colonial store closed in Bombay in 1952.

With the closure of branches overseas, plans turned to the expansion of the domestic business. The purchase of the first of a number of provincial department stores was made in 1953 with the acquisition of Genge & Co of Dorchester. This was swiftly followed by the purchase of William Harvey of Guildford in the same year. In 1955, the company added J D Morant of Chichester. Further purchases included Thomas Clarkson of Wolverhampton in 1960, Thomas White & Co of Aldershot in 1961, Burgis & Colbourne of Leamington Spa in 1963 and Parsons & Hart of Andover in 1965. The Bromley stores of Harrison Gibson were added to the group in 1968. It was not only acquisitions that money was being spent on – a new store was built in Camberley in 1964 and branded under the William Harvey name, while the stores in Guildford, Chichester, Dorchester and Wolverhampton were given new extensions.

Work on replacing the old Victoria Street store began in 1973. The new building was completed in 1977, designed by London architects Elsom Pack & Roberts.

In 1973, Army and Navy Stores was purchased by the House of Fraser. The John Barker & Co stores in Kensington and Eastbourne were integrated with Army & Navy. The group was later extended with the addition of the Chiesmans stores, among others, to its portfolio.

Branches
 Aldershot, formerly Thomas White.
 Andover, Parsons & Hart; acquired 1965; sold to F W Woolworth & Co. in 1967.
 Basildon, formerly Taylors of Basildon; purchased by House of Fraser in 1979; closed 1994.
 Bexleyheath, formerly Chiesmans
 Bromley, formerly Harrison Gibson; acquired 1968; closed 2004. Part of the site is currently occupied by TK Maxx.
 Camberley, formerly Harveys of Camberley; opened by Army & Navy Stores as a satellite store of William Harvey of Guildford. The store was renamed Army & Navy in 1974.
 Chichester, formerly J D Morant. The business was founded in Southsea, Hampshire and moved to its location opposite Chichester Cathedral in 1942 after its original premises were destroyed by enemy bombing.
 Dorchester, formerly Genge & Co. (originally Genge, Dixon & Jameson).
 Eastbourne, formerly Barkers (originally Dale & Kerley); closed 1997 (the building was subsequently occupied by T J Hughes between 1999 and 2019).
 Epsom, opened 1984; renamed Dickins & Jones in 1987.
 Gravesend, formerly Chiesmans (originally Bon Marche).
 Guildford, formerly William Harvey.
 Hove, formerly Chiesmans (previously Stuart Norris and originally Driscolls).
 Ilford, formerly Chiesmans (originally Burnes).
 Kingston-upon-Thames, formerly Chiesmans (originally Hide & Co.).
 Leamington Spa, formerly Burgis & Colbourne; renamed  Rackhams in 1976.
 Lewisham, formerly Chiesmans / Chiesman Brothers; closed 1997.
 Maidstone, formerly Chiesmans (originally Denniss Paine & Co.).
 Maidstone, formerly T C Dunning & Son; closed 2005.
 Newport, Isle of Wight, formerly Chiesmans (originally  Morris of Newport / Edward Morris & Co.).
 Rochester, formerly Chiesmans (originally Leonards).
 Southend-on-Sea, formerly Chiesmans (previously a satellite store of J R Roberts of Stratford; originally Ravens); closed 1987.
 St. Albans, formerly Greens / W S Green.
 Tunbridge Wells, formerly Chiesmans (originally Waymarks).
 Upton Park, formerly Chiesmans (previously The John Lewis Store of Upton Park and originally a satellite store of John Lewis & Co. of Oxford Street).
 Winchester, formerly Chiesmans.
 Wolverhampton, formerly Thomas Clarkson & Sons.

Subsidiaries
On 13 November 1973, the proposed merger between Boots and House of Fraser companies was subject of a written question in the House of Commons and the following companies were listed as subsidiaries of Army & Navy:

William Harvey of Guildford Ltd.
Harveys of Camberley
Army & Navy Stores (Bromley) Ltd.
Genge & Company Ltd.
Thomas White & Company Ltd.
J. D. Morant Ltd.
Thomas Clarkson & Sons Ltd.
Burgis & Colbourne Ltd.
Artillery Mansions Ltd.

References

External links 
 Official site
 Pages from the store's catalogue 1939-40
 

Buildings and structures in the City of Westminster
Buildings and structures in Chichester
Companies based in the City of Westminster
Former co-operatives of the United Kingdom
Demutualized organizations
Defunct retail companies of the United Kingdom
Defunct department stores of the United Kingdom
House of Fraser
Shops in London
Retail companies established in 1871
1871 establishments in England
History of the City of Westminster
Consumers' cooperatives in the United States
Victoria, London